Jump Trading LLC is a proprietary trading firm with a focus on algorithmic and high-frequency trading strategies. The firm has over 700 employees in Chicago, New York, Austin, London, Tel Aviv, Singapore, Shanghai, Bristol, Gurgaon, Gandhinagar, Sydney, Amsterdam, Hong Kong, and Paris and is active in futures, options, cryptocurrency, and equities markets worldwide.

The company is a member of the Principal Traders Group, an advisory group formed by the Futures Industry Association (FIA) to represent principal traders (i.e. independent proprietary trading firms that trade only on their own accounts).

Jump has been privately funded throughout its existence.

History 
Jump Trading was founded in 1999 by two former pit traders, Paul Gurinas and Bill Disomma, who met in the Deutsche Mark pit at the Chicago Mercantile Exchange (CME). While the firm got its start in the open outcry pits, Jump Trading does most of its trading electronically.

The company has made substantial investments in high-frequency trading and infrastructure, including a Belgian microwave tower once owned by NATO, purchased in 2013 by a U.K. affiliate.

Following the 2010 flash crash, Disomma, Gurinas, and COO Matt Schrecengost met with CFTC chairman Gary Gensler to discuss the definition of spoofing as a disruptive trade practice as well as transparency and access to SEFs. This meeting contributed to regulatory efforts to implement new market rules stemming from the Dodd–Frank Act.

In April 2014, Jump was one of six high-speed trading firms subpoenaed by New York Attorney General Eric Schneiderman regarding their trading strategies, as well as the special arrangements they may have with exchanges and dark pools.

In May 2018, Jump was fined $250,000 by the Securities and Exchange Commission (SEC) due to a malfunction in one of its trading algorithms leading to the accidental accumulation of a short position worth hundreds of millions of dollars.

Gurinas and DiSomma also founded a venture capital firm, Jump Capital, in June 2012. By January 2016, the firm had invested in 30 companies. Jump Capital also invested $5 million in The Small Exchange in May 2019, a start-up retail trading futures exchange.

Jump Trading is a registered broker-dealer and member of multiple exchanges including the CME Group and the New York Stock Exchange.
They are also members of most European exchanges including Eurex and the London Stock Exchange.

In September 2021, Jump announced their cryptocurrency business through a new brand named Jump Crypto

Charitable work 
In 2013, Jump Trading donated $25 million to fund the creation of the Jump Trading Simulation and Education Center.

In February 2014, Jump Trading donated an additional $25 million to fund a joint medical research project between a Peoria simulation & education center and the University of Illinois at Urbana-Champaign's College of Engineering. In a statement from the institutions, the donation will support doctors and engineers working together on clinical simulation, education and health care issues striving to "improve the quality of care and outcomes for patients" and "reduce health care costs".

References 

Financial services companies based in Illinois
Financial services companies established in 1999
American companies established in 1999
Companies based in Chicago
1999 establishments in Illinois